The men's sprint cross-country skiing competition at the 2002 Winter Olympics in Salt Lake City, United States, was held on 19 February at Soldier Hollow.

Seventy-two skiers competed in the qualifying round, of which the 16 fastest competitors advanced to the final rounds. The 16 competitors who advanced from the qualification were divided into 4 quarterfinal heats of 4 skier each. The two best competitors in each quarterfinal advanced to the semifinal. The two best competitors in each semifinal advanced to the A Final competing for gold, silver, bronze and fourth place. The two lowest ranked competitors in the semifinal were placed in the B Final, competing for ranks from 5th to 8th position.

Results 
 Q — qualified for next round

Qualifying
72 competitors started the qualification race.

Final results

References

Men's cross-country skiing at the 2002 Winter Olympics
Men's individual sprint cross-country skiing at the Winter Olympics